Eduard Derzsei (27 October 1934 – 21 May 2015) was a Romanian volleyball player. He competed in the men's tournament at the 1964 Summer Olympics.

References

1934 births
2015 deaths
Romanian men's volleyball players
Olympic volleyball players of Romania
Volleyball players at the 1964 Summer Olympics
People from Baraolt